Jack Grant  (29 May 1883 – 29 December 1954) was an Australian rules footballer who played for the Carlton Football Club and St Kilda Football Club in the Victorian Football League (VFL).

Notes

External links 
		
Jack Grant's profile at Blueseum		
 

1883 births
1954 deaths
Australian rules footballers from Victoria (Australia)
Carlton Football Club players
St Kilda Football Club players